Sun Wei (born 12 August 1995, in Nantong, Jiangsu) is a Chinese artistic gymnast. He is a 2018 world champion in the team competition and a member of the 2020 Olympic team.

Personal life 
Sun was born 12 August 1995 in Nantong, China. He started gymnastics at age three; he was a weak child, and his parents wanted his strength to improve.

He studied at the Nanjing Sport Institute.

Career

2017 
In May 2017, Sun competed at the Asian Championships in Bangkok, Thailand, where his team won gold.

2018 
In August, Sun competed at the Asian Games in Indonesia, where his team won first. Sun placed second on high bar and third on pommel horse.

In October, he was part of the Chinese team at the 2018 World Artistic Gymnastics Championships in Doha, Qatar, and helped his country to gold medal in the team event. He also qualified for the all-around final where he placed fourth.

2019 
Sun competed at the World Championships in Stuttgart, Germany, where his team placed second.

2021 
At the 2020 Summer Olympics in Tokyo, Japan, Sun competed for the People's Republic of China, a team including Sun Wei, Zou Jingyuan, Xiao Ruoteng, and Lin Chaopan. The team won Olympic bronze with a combined score of 262.397, 0.606 points beneath the winning team.
Sun also qualified for the men's individual all-around, where he placed 4th.

Detailed Results

References

External links 
 
 
 

1995 births
Living people
Chinese male artistic gymnasts
Gymnasts at the 2018 Asian Games
Medalists at the 2018 Asian Games
Asian Games gold medalists for China
Asian Games silver medalists for China
Asian Games bronze medalists for China
Asian Games medalists in gymnastics
Sportspeople from Nantong
Gymnasts from Jiangsu
Gymnasts at the 2020 Summer Olympics
Olympic gymnasts of China
Olympic bronze medalists for China
Medalists at the 2020 Summer Olympics
Olympic medalists in gymnastics
21st-century Chinese people